Infjärdens SK  is a Swedish football team from Roknäs in Piteå Municipality, Norrbotten that is currently playing in Division 3 Norra Norrland .

Background
Infjärdens SK (abbreviated ISK) originates from three clubs:

Långnäs IF (formed 1931) specialising in football, bandy, skiing, athletics and hockey.
Rokna IF (formed 1932) specialising in  football, skiing, hockey and table tennis.
Sjulnäs IF (formed 1943) specialising in football.

In 1949 Sjulnäs IF merged with Rokna IF to become Rokna-Sjulnäs SK (RSSK). The main activities of the club were football and hockey.  In 1966 RSSK merged with Långnäs IF (LIF) to form Rokna-Långnäs SK (RLSK).

Many questions were asked in later years why Sjulnäs was not in the club's title particularly as Sjulnäs is the main town in the club's catchment area. It was decided then to adopt the club name Infjärdens SK (ISK) and this was finally confirmed at a launching ceremony at the Sjulnäs sports hall on 29 January 1990.

ISK today has a large catchment area for the club's activities catering for extensive youth activities and successful senior citizen activities. The club continues to evolve and welcomes new members to join ISK.

Infjärdens SK are affiliated to Norrbottens Fotbollförbund.

Season to season

* League restructuring in 2006 resulted in a new division being created at Tier 3 and subsequent divisions dropping a level.

Footnotes

External links
  Official website
  Infjärdens SK Facebook
  Infjärdens SK Supporters Facebook

Association football clubs established in 1990
Infjardens, SK
1990 establishments in Sweden